My Life may refer to:

Autobiographies
 Mein Leben (Wagner) (My Life), by Richard Wagner, 1870
 My Life (Clinton autobiography), by Bill Clinton, 2004
 My Life (Meir autobiography), by Golda Meir, 1973
 My Life (Mosley autobiography), by Oswald Mosley, 1968
 My Life (Trotsky autobiography), by Leon Trotsky, 1930
 My Life: A Spoken Autobiography, by Fidel Castro, with Ignacio Ramonet, 2006
 My Life, by Isadora Duncan, 1927
 My Life, by Lyn Hejinian, 1980
 My Life, by Magic Johnson, 1992
 My Life, by David Lange, 2005
 My Life, by Burt Reynolds, 1994
 My Life, by John Starks, 2004
 My Life, by Alfred Russel Wallace, 1905

Music

Albums
 My Life (Alan Dawa Dolma album) or the title song, 2009
 My Life (Don Chezina album), 2007
 My Life (Grace Griffith album) or the title song, 2006
 My Life (Iris DeMent album) or the title song, 1994
 My Life (Jake Shimabukuro album), 2007
 My Life (Mary J. Blige album) or the title song, 1994
 My Life (Rain album), 2017
 My Life (Ronnie Milsap album) or the title song, 2006
 My Life: The Greatest Hits, by Julio Iglesias, 1998
 My Life: The True Testimony, by Blood Raw, 2008
 My Life, a 1999 album by Antidote
 My Life, a 2004 album by Hideaki Tokunaga
 My Life, a 2008 album by Mai Hoshimura
 My Life, a 2019 album by Marwa Loud

Songs
 "My Life" (50 Cent song), 2012
 "My Life" (Billy Joel song), 1978
 "My Life" (Bliss N Eso song), 2013
 "My Life" (The Game song), 2008
 "My Life" (Hot Rod song), 2012
 "My Life" (J. Cole, 21 Savage and Morray song), 2021
 "My Life" (Kids in the Kitchen song), 1985
 "My Life" (Phil Ochs song), 1969
 "My Life" (Slaughterhouse song), 2012
 "My Life (Throw It Away If I Want To)", by Bill Anderson, 1969
 "My Life", by 12 Stones from 12 Stones, 2002
 "My Life", by Big Tymers from I Got That Work, 2000
 "My Life", by C-Murder from The Tru Story: Continued, 2006
 "My Life", by DJ Khaled from We the Best Forever, 2011
 "My Life", by Dido from No Angel, 1999
 "My Life", by E-40 from The Block Brochure: Welcome to the Soil 2, 2012
 "My Life", by Erykah Badu from Mama's Gun, 2000
 "My Life", by Imagine Dragons from Mercury – Act 1, 2021
 "My Life", by Jesse Johnson, 1996
 "My Life", by jj from jj n° 3, 2010
 "My Life", by John Frusciante and Josh Klinghoffer from A Sphere in the Heart of Silence, 2004
 "My Life", by John Lennon from John Lennon Anthology, 1998
 "My Life", by K. Michelle from Rebellious Soul, 2013
 "My Life", by KRS-One from Life, 2006
 "My Life", by Mark Owen from In Your Own Time, 2003
 "My Life", by NF from Perception, 2017
 "My Life", by the Ohio Players from Contradiction, 1976
 "My Life", by Oingo Boingo from Boi-ngo, 1987
 "My Life", by Reks from Grey Hairs, 2008
 "My Life", by Robin Thicke from Despicable Me: Original Motion Picture Soundtrack, 2010
 "My Life", by Sleeping with Sirens from Gossip, 2017
 "My Life", by Styles P from A Gangster and a Gentleman, 2002
 "My Life", by T.I. from Urban Legend, 2004
 "My Life", by TLC from FanMail, 1999
 "My Life", by Tanvi Shah from the film Saroja, 2008
 "My Life", by Wumpscut from Music for a Slaughtering Tribe, 1993
 "My Life", by Zhu with Tame Impala from Ringos Desert, 2018
 "My Life", by Zion I from Break a Dawn, 2006

Other
 My Life (film), a 1993 drama
 "My Life" (novella), an 1896 novella by Anton Chekhov
 My Life: Karate Kids, a 2010 British television documentary
 MyLife, an American information brokerage firm

See also
 In My Life (disambiguation)
 The Story of My Life (disambiguation)
 This Is My Life (disambiguation)
 It's My Life (disambiguation)
 Mi Vida (disambiguation)
 My Life and Loves, by Frank Harris